Rauna is an extinct genus of prawn, containing the single species Rauna angusta, described from the Solnhofen limestones of southern Germany.

References

Penaeidae
Jurassic crustaceans
Crustaceans described in 1839
Fossil taxa described in 1839
Solnhofen fauna